Buffalo Public School No. 44, also known as Lincoln School, is a historic school building located on the East Side of Buffalo, once the city's Polish-American enclave. The original section was built in 1907, and is a three-story, red brick, "E"-shaped building with Renaissance Revival detailing. Major additions were made to the original building in 1930 and 1975. Architectural details include Onondaga limestone trim and Ionic pilasters with red terra cotta bases and capitals. The building reflects the evolution of standardized urban public school designs in the early 20th century.

It was listed on the National Register of Historic Places in 2018.

References

School buildings on the National Register of Historic Places in New York (state)
Renaissance Revival architecture in New York (state)
School buildings completed in 1907
Buildings and structures in Buffalo, New York
National Register of Historic Places in Buffalo, New York
1907 establishments in New York (state)